Hurricane Pass is a pedestrian mountain pass located in the Teton Range, Grand Teton National Park, in the U.S. state of Wyoming. Views of the west slopes of several of the highest Teton Range peaks as well as Alaska Basin and Battleship Mountain in Caribou-Targhee National Forest are available at the pass.

References

Mountain passes of Wyoming
Mountain passes of Teton County, Wyoming